David M. Regan is a Canadian psychologist, currently a Distinguished Professor Emeritus at York University and a Fellow of the Optical Society, American Academy of Optometry, Royal Society of Canada, and Canadian Psychological Association. From 1978 to 1983, he was York's I. W. Killam Research Professor.

Regan was elected foreign member of the Royal Netherlands Academy of Arts and Sciences in 1999. In 2003, Regan was awarded the Donald O. Hebb Award for Distinguished Contributions to Psychology as a Science from the Canadian Psychological Association.

References

Year of birth missing (living people)
Living people
Academic staff of York University
Canadian psychologists
Members of the Royal Netherlands Academy of Arts and Sciences